Class 333 may refer to:

 British Rail Class 333, electric multiple unit train built by CAF between 2000-2003
 Renfe Class 333, diesel-electric locomotive built in the 1970s